Vielle-Saint-Girons is a commune in the Landes department in Nouvelle-Aquitaine in southwestern France.

Population

See also
Communes of the Landes department

References

External links
 City hall of Vielle-Saint-Girons
 Tourism Office of Vielle-Saint-Girons

Communes of Landes (department)